Aphomia curvicostellus is a species of snout moth in the genus Aphomia. It was described by Zerny, in 1914, and is known from Kazakhstan.

The length of the forewings is 12–15 mm.

References

Moths described in 1914
Tirathabini
Moths of Asia